Ian Walsh (born May 9, 1972) is an American ice hockey official who was worked as a National Hockey League referee since the 2000–01 NHL season He wears uniform number 29.

Early life 
Walsh was born in Philadelphia in 1972 and started officiating ice hockey in the Delaware Valley region at age 15.

Career 
Walsh has also worked as an official in the United States Hockey League and the ECHL. He first NHL game was a matchup between the New Jersey Devils and the Anaheim Ducks on October 14, 2000. He worked his first NHL playoff game between the Detroit Red Wings and the Columbus Blue Jackets on April 16, 2009. Walsh's 1,000th game officiated occurred on October 21, 2017, between the Philadelphia Flyers and Edmonton Oilers.

References

1972 births
Living people
National Hockey League officials
Sportspeople from Philadelphia
American ice hockey officials

Ice hockey people from Pennsylvania